Tri-Star Customs and Forwarding Ltd v Denning [1999] 1 NZLR 33 is a cited case in New Zealand regarding unilateral mistakes under the Contractual Mistakes Act 1977.

Background
The Dennings leased a commercial building to Tristar. A condition of the lease agreement, gave Tristar the right to purchase the building for $720,000. An option that Tristar later accepted.

However, whilst the lease agreement clearly stated that the rentals were GST exclusive, the purchase price of $720,000 was silent regarding whether it exclusive or inclusive of GST.

This was unfortunate for the Dennings, as under NZ tax law, it was deemed that it was GST inclusive, although they successfully obtained relief in the High Court.

Tristar appealed.

Held
A bench of five of the Court Appeal ruled that the Contractual Mistakes Act 1977 requires that Tristar had actual knowledge of the mistake at the time, and not merely "ought to of known" of the mistake as was the old common law standard. Henry J stated "It may of course be proper for the Court to infer actual knowledge from proved circumstances, even if the person in question denies having that knowledge".

References

Court of Appeal of New Zealand cases
New Zealand contract case law
1998 in New Zealand law
1998 in case law